Bozineh Jerd (also Romanized as Bozīneh Jerd; also known as Bezanjerd, Bezenjerd, Bizīneh-i-Jird, Bīznajerd, and Bozan Jerd) is a village in Chah Dasht Rural District, Shara District, Hamadan County, Hamadan Province, Iran. At the 2006 census, its population was 56, in 13 families.

References 

Populated places in Hamadan County